Stephen Robert Meskers known as Steve Meskers (born July 3, 1958) is an American politician who is currently serving as the representative from the 150th district in the Connecticut House of Representatives for the Democratic Party since 2019. His district includes part of Greenwich, Connecticut. He is also a member on the Town Representative Meeting (RTM), District 6 in Greenwich.

Meskers was first elected to the seat in 2018, narrowly defeating incumbent Republican Michael Bocchino. Meskers currently serves on the House's Insurance and Real Estate Committee, Transportation Committee, Energy and Technology Committee, and Finance, Revenue, and Bonding Committee.

Early life and education 
Stephen Robert Meskers was born on July 3, 1958, in  Greenwich, Connecticut. He graduated from Fordham University with a Bachelor of Arts in Economics and Spanish in 1980. He then completed his education by graduating from Pace University with a Master of Business Administration.

Early Career 
From 1983 to 1988, he worked for Irving Trust as an associate attorney before winning elections to the Greenwich RTM and the Connecticut House of Representatives. He later oversaw Bank Santander's division of emerging market sales and fixed income from 1998 - 2010. In the years that followed, he served as the Executive Director of Emerging Markets at Crédit Agricole from 2010 to 2016 and was director of emerging market fixed income sales with Rencap Securities from 2016 to 2017.

He began his political career when he was elected to the Greenwich RTM in 2002.

Connecticut House of Representatives

Elections

2018 
Meskers was elected to the Connecticut House of Representatives in 2018, narrowly defeating incumbent Republican Michael Bocchino, garnering 52.1% of the vote to Bocchino's 47.9% of the vote.

2020 
Meskers was reelected to the Connecticut House of Representatives in 2020 by a likely margin, defeating Republican Joe Kelly with 54.9% to 45.1%.

2022 
Meskers was reelected to the Connecticut House of Representatives in 2022, defeating Republican Ed Lopez with 58.8% of the vote to Lopez's 41.2% of the vote.

Tenure 
Meskers currently serves on the House's Insurance and Real Estate Committee, Transportation Committee, Energy and Technology Committee, and Finance, Revenue, and Bonding Committee.

Electoral History

Personal life 
Meskers lives in Greenwich, Connecticut with his wife Monica Meskers and his three children Christian, Victoria, and Isabel.

References

External links 
 

Living people
Democratic Party members of the Connecticut House of Representatives
People from Greenwich, Connecticut
21st-century American politicians
Fordham University alumni
1958 births